Firura is an extinct volcano of the Central Andean Volcanic Belt, located in the Arequipa Region of southern Peru. Together with Sara Sara, Solimana and Coropuna it forms one of the Central Andean volcanoes. It is in the Andes, north of the Pucuncho Basin.

Description
Aside from the main summit Firura, there also are Soncco Orcco, Jahsaya and separating Firura from Solimana Antapuna. The complex has generated basaltic or basaltic andesite lava flows that reach down into inhabited areas, as well as an ignimbrite resulting from the collapse of the ancient crater. A collapse of the crater was also responsible for the formation of a landslide dam in the Cotahuasi River valley. The date of the last volcanic activity is Pleistocene to Holocene, but it does not appear to be a significant hazard.

Much of the southern side of the volcano above  altitude is covered with perennial snow. This glacier appears to be located above the local equilibrium line altitude.

Firura has well preserved moraine systems. The prevalent aridity of the climate impedes the degradation of these moraines.

References 

Volcanoes of Peru
Mountains of Arequipa Region
Andean Volcanic Belt
Mountains of Peru
Pleistocene volcanoes
Pleistocene Peru